Kannika is a 1947 Indian Tamil-language film starring M. S. Sarojini, T. E. Varadan and M. R. Santhanalakshmi. The film was directed and produced by S. M. Sriramulu Naidu.

Plot 
King Paligna is a demon king whose life is imprisoned inside a dove. He constantly sacrifices young women, with a belief that by doing this, his soul will be made immortal. Shiva creates a man, Kumaran, to kill the king and end the sacrifices. After many twists and turns, Kumaran destroys Paligna by killing the dove and marries the king's daughter, Malini.

Cast 

Male cast
 T. E. Varadan  as Kumaran
 D. Balasubramaniam as Palignan
 N. S. Krishnan as Veeran
 Kali. N. Rathnam as Pujari
 B. Rajagopala Iyer as Shivan
 K. Ramu as Vishnu
 A. V. Natarajan as Brahma
 Narsimhan as Naradar
 N. S. Narayana Pillai as Commander
 Ezhumalai as Pujari's disciple

Female cast
 M. S. Sarojini as Malini
 Hemamalini as young Malini
 M. R. Santhanalakshmi as Kannika
 Harini as young Kannika
 T. A. Mathuram as Prabhavathi
 Lalitha-Padmini as Shiva-Mohini
Choreography
 Vazhuvoor Ramaiah Pillai

Soundtrack 
The music was composed by A. V. Natarajan and the lyrics were penned by Papanasam Sivan except "Nadanam Aadinaar", which was penned by Gopala Krishna Bharathiyaar. Singers are M. S. Sarojini, T. E. Varadan and M. R. Santhanalakshmi. Playback singer is S. S. Mani.

Release and reception 
Kannika was released on 11 November 1947, and distributed by Narayanan Company. It emerged a box-office bomb. Film historian Randor Guy wrote in 2011 that the film will be "Remembered for the melodious music, impressive cinematography and the interesting onscreen narration."

References

External links 

1940s Tamil-language films
1947 films
Indian black-and-white films
Films directed by S. M. Sriramulu Naidu